Woolwich was a borough constituency represented in the House of Commons of the Parliament of the United Kingdom from 1885 to 1918 and from 1983 to 1997. It centred on Woolwich, now in the Royal Borough of Greenwich in south-east London.

Will Crooks, Member of Parliament for Woolwich 1903–10 and 1910–18, was one of the first Labour MPs in the United Kingdom.

History 
In 1918, the seat was split into Woolwich East and Woolwich West. In 1983, most of Woolwich West became Eltham while the recreated Woolwich constituency was largely based on Woolwich East. In 1997, the seat was split up along different lines, with part of it going into neighbouring Erith and Thamesmead, and part of it merging with the Greenwich seat to form the new Greenwich and Woolwich seat.

Boundaries 

1885–1918: The parishes of Woolwich, Eltham and Plumstead.

1983–1997: The London Borough of Greenwich wards of Abbey Wood, Arsenal, Burrage, Eynsham, Glyndon, Lakedale, Plumstead Common, St Mary's, St Nicholas, Shrewsbury, Slade, Thamesmead Moorings, and Woolwich Common.

Members of Parliament

MPs 1885–1918

MPs 1983–1997

Elections

Elections in the 1990s

Elections in the 1980s

Elections in the 1910s

Elections in the 1900s

Elections in the 1890s

Elections in the 1880s

References

Sources 

Parliamentary constituencies in London (historic)
Constituencies of the Parliament of the United Kingdom established in 1885
Constituencies of the Parliament of the United Kingdom disestablished in 1918
Constituencies of the Parliament of the United Kingdom established in 1983
Constituencies of the Parliament of the United Kingdom disestablished in 1997
Woolwich